Leon Henze (born 9 March 1992) is a German former professional footballer who plays as a midfielder.

External links
 
 
 

1992 births
Living people
German footballers
Association football midfielders
3. Liga players
Regionalliga players
SV Werder Bremen II players
Lupo Martini Wolfsburg players
People from Wolfenbüttel
Footballers from Lower Saxony